Francisco Beltrão, established on December 14, 1952, is a municipality in the state of Paraná in Brazil. In 2010, the population was 80,727, of which 85% lived in the city proper and 15% on the surrounding land. Francisco Beltrão is very close to two other cities, Marmeleiro and Renascença. Its economy is based on agriculture, corn crops, turkey and chicken meat exports, textiles, aluminium pans, mobile industries, public services and small commerce.

Brief 
Francisco Beltrão is in the center of the southwest region of Paraná state, which encompasses about 500,000 inhabitants in a 20,000 square kilometer (about 7,700 square mile) area, nearly 5% of the whole state's population and 10% of the entire state's area. Most of the town's surrounding population resides in small agriculture-based villages and towns with only low-level services, leading to them often having to utilize services in the main regional settlement, thus concentrating a large number of the region's economic activities in Francisco Beltrão.

Paulo Abdala Airport serves the city.

Geography 

Francisco Beltrão is located in the third parana's highland. The downtown elevation is around 550 meters while the surrounding area rises as high 950 m, causing the city to take on a bowl shape. Several rivers run through this area, the most important being the "Rio Marrecas", where the first settlement was established about 1950.

Climate 
Köppen-Geiger climate classification system classifies its climate as humid subtropical (Cfa).

Summer winds are calm, causing the heat index to be high.

During nights of calm wind, the bowl-like shape of the city causes the cold air to descend in the city's center, causing the temperatures to decline much more than in the surrounding areas. However, as soon as the sun rises, this effect quickly vanishes.

Snow is rare, appearing once or twice every ten years (the four most recent snows were in July 2007, July 1975, July 1965, and July 1955). Freezes are more common and occur throughout the winter, for up to 20 days a year.

Economy 
Since 2000, the GDP has growth over 7.5% annually. Unemployment has dropped from 11% of its 35,000 economically active people to somewhat over 6% as of 2006.

For the last three years, the city was proportionally ranked first (and generally no lower than fifth) in job-creation throughout the state of Paraná.

Culture 
Most inhabitants are descendants of Italian and German immigrants, who first lived in the southern states of Rio Grande do Sul and Santa Catarina before coming to the region between the 1940s and the 1960s. According to some researchers, 50% of population descends from Italian immigrants while 15% are descendants of German immigrants. These proportions are likely to decrease as young people move around Brazil and northern Brazilian residents move to this city.

References